The Au Sable Institute of Environmental Studies is an educational organization that provides field-based environmental science courses to students from participating Christian colleges. By educating and inspiring future leaders, Au Sable has been a major player in the Creation Care movement within evangelical Christianity.

The campus is located in northern lower Michigan, outside of Mancelona, Michigan. Courses are also offered in Washington State, India, and Costa Rica, through partnerships with other organizations.

References

Educational organizations based in the United States